Novi Svet is a dispersed settlement in the hills west of Hotedršica in the Municipality of Logatec in the Inner Carniola region of Slovenia.

Geography
It includes the hamlets of Gorenji Novi Svet to the northwest and Dolenji Novi Svet to the southeast, as well as the isolated Vrbanček farm. The area is mostly covered by needleleaf forest with many karst dells, sinkholes, and caves. The village has little arable land and sparse meadows, and so its residents have traditionally made a living from forestry.

Name
The name Novi Svet literally means 'new area, new territory'. The name refers to the fact that the area was settled more recently than neighboring villages after wooded land was cleared.

History

Some Slavic settlement may have already taken place in Novi Svet as early as the sixth century. Novi Svet was mentioned in historical sources in the 15th century in connection with iron working; the blast furnace that it supplied shut down in the 1589 due to a lack of ore. Settlers are said to have arrived in larger numbers in Novi Svet from Veharše in nearby Medvedje Brdo after the iron mining was abandoned there in the late 16th century, and also during French rule in the early 19th century in an effort to avoid military service.

During the First World War, Russian prisoners of war were used for labor in the area. The projects they worked on included building the road from Kalce to Podkraj; there is a curve along the road in the territory of Novi Svet known as Ruska rajda 'the Russian Curve', named after the prisoners.

Between the First and Second World Wars, the territory of Novi Svet lay west of the Rapallo border, in the Kingdom of Italy. The remains of the Italian border and customs posts along the road from Hotedršica to Godovič are located in the northeastern territory of Novi Svet.

References

External links

Novi Svet on Geopedia

Populated places in the Municipality of Logatec